The 1st Squadron is a Recce squadron in the Air Component of the Belgian Armed Forces. Based at Florennes air base, it is part of the 2nd Tactical Wing and operates the General Dynamics F-16 Block 20 MLU Fighting Falcon.

The 1re Escadrille de Chasse was the first fighter squadron of the Belgian Air Component. The squadron was founded during World War I, reorganized into a dedicated fighter unit, and became part of a fighter wing before war's end.

History

The origins 
The 1re Escadrille de Chasse was founded in February 1916 as the first dedicated squadron of the Aviation Militaire Belge. It drew upon the men and equipment of the previously existing provisional Escadrille I. In August 1917, upon receiving the new Hanriot-Dupont 1 aircraft, the first version of  the famous “Thistle” symbol was designed by André de Meulemeester as the squadron's insignia, to be painted on the aircraft. He also selected the squadron motto “Nemo me impune lacessit” or “No-one can challenge me unpunished”. In March 1918, it would be reorganized into the 9ème Escadrille.

Aerodromes 
 Coxyde: February 1916 - June 1916
 Les Moeres: June 1916 - March 1918

Notable personnel 

 André de Meulemeester
 Fernand Jacquet
Jan Olieslagers
 Willy Coppens

Aircraft used 
 Nieuport 10
 Nieuport Scout
Nieuport 16
Nieuport 17
Hanriot HD.1
Sopwith Camel
F-84 E/G/F
Mirage 5BA

Operations 
At the start of World War I, Belgium was neutral. An overwhelming invasion by the German army left Belgium partially occupied by the end of 1914, with its preserved territory shielded by deliberate defensive flooding at Nieuwpoort by the Belgians. As a result, the Aviation Militaire Belge was based in the diminished remnant of a small country, and performed largely in a static defensive mode. 
Captain Fernand Jacquet and Lieutenant Louis Robin scored the squadron's first victory on 20 May 1916. It would claim 52 aerial victories and be credited with 15, at a blood cost of five Belgian pilots killed in action and one accidental death.

Present day
After World War II, the modern Belgian Air Force was founded in 1946. The "Thistle" was accorded to 351 Squadron of 161st Wing at Florennes air base. On January 10, 1948, this unit became 1st Squadron of 2nd Wing. From that day to the present, the squadron shares the identity and the traditions of the 1ère Escadrille de Chasse of 1917 .
In July 1971, 1 Squadron leaves Florennes for Bierset, to constitute 3rd Wing together with 8 Squadron. Designated to transform to the F-16, the unit swaps bases with 42 Squadron of Florennes in 1989.

Airbases 
 Florennes: 1948-1971 ; 1989–Present
 Bierset : 1971-1989 (Brustem: 1981)

Aircraft used 
 Spitfire XIV
 F-16 Fighting Falcon

References 
 Champagne, Jacques P. & Detournay, Gaston L. Blasons Familiers d'une Chevalerie Nouvelle. Editions CARACTERE - Arlon
 Mangin, Jean A. & Champagne, Jacques P & Van Den Rul, Marcel A. Sous nos ailes. G. Everling - Arlon (1977)
 Pieters, Walter M. Above Flanders' Fields: A Complete Record of the Belgian Fighter Pilots and Their Units During the Great War, 1914-1918.  Grub Street, 1998. , 
 Air Action 19. Guhl & Associés, 1990. ISSN 0992-065X.

Endnotes

Fighter Squadron, 1
Military units and formations established in 1913
1913 establishments in Belgium